Evert Hubertus Kroes (born 4 May 1950) is a retired Dutch rower. He competed in the coxed four event at the 1972 and 1976 Summer Olympics and finished in seventh and tenth place, respectively.

References 

1950 births
Living people
Dutch male rowers
Olympic rowers of the Netherlands
Rowers at the 1972 Summer Olympics
Rowers at the 1976 Summer Olympics
Sportspeople from Leiden